The Lost Face (German: Das verlorene Gesicht) is a 1948 German drama film directed by Kurt Hoffmann and starring Marianne Hoppe, Gustav Fröhlich and Richard Häussler. The plot of a woman with two divided personalities caused by a recent trauma drew inspiration from the Gainsborough Melodrama Madonna of the Seven Moons which had been extremely popular on its release in Germany.

It was made at the Bavaria Studios in Munich with Location shooting taking place in Heidelberg. The film's sets were designed by the art director Hans Kuhnert.

Synopsis
In Stuttgart a lost and disorientated young woman is found. It is assumed she is from Tibet. She receives care from a doctor and falls in love with a lawyer. Yet suddenly her face and voice change and she emerges as a completely different woman.

Cast
 Marianne Hoppe as Johanna Stegen
 Gustav Fröhlich as Dr. Thomas Martin
 Richard Häussler as 	Robert Lorm
 Paul Dahlke as Axel Witt
 Hermine Körner as 	Frau von Aldenhoff
 Harald Mannl as Leo L'Arronge
 Rudolf Vogel as Professor Kersten
 Walter Kiaulehn as Anstaltsarzt
 Erich Ponto as Wissenschaftler
 Bruno Hübner as Bildhauer
 Herbert Weicker as Dr. Rasan
 Ruth Killer as Sonja
 Eva Vaitl as Dame
 Helmuth Renar as Geheimrat Winter

References

Bibliography 
 Bergfelder, Tim. International Adventures: German Popular Cinema and European Co-Productions in the 1960s. Berghahn Books, 2005.

External links

1948 films
1948 drama films
German drama films
1940s German-language films
Films directed by Kurt Hoffmann
Films shot at Bavaria Studios
1940s German films